Numedia is the debut album of the Slovenian band Naio Ssaion. The album was released in April 2004 by CPZ Publishing and peaked at number fourteen on the Slovenian album chart.

Track listing

 N.Ss
 Bla Bla
 Ailu
 Ran
 Sms
 Gen X
 Zaika
 Libero
 Bordo
 Homo Sapiens

References

2004 debut albums
Naio Ssaion albums